Brian Allan Dopirak (born December 20, 1983) is an American former professional baseball first baseman.

Early life

High school
Dopirak attended Dunedin High School.  He was originally selected by Chicago Cubs in the second round (56th overall) of the 2002 Major League Baseball draft.

Professional career

Chicago Cubs
Dopirak spent 2002, his first professional season, with the Arizona League Cubs batting .253 with no home runs and 6 runs.  In 2003, Dopirak played for the Boise Hawks of the Northwest League, one of the Cubs Class-A level teams batting .240 while clubbing 13 home runs and 37 runs batted in. He was then promoted to another Class-A team the Lansing Lugnuts of Midwest League, concluding the 2003 hitting another 2 more home runs.  In 2004, he hit 39 homers and 120 RBIs with Lansing to go along with a .307 batting average.

After the 2004 season, Dopirak experienced injury problems.  He hit below .300 and compiled only 35 home runs from 2005 to 2007. The Cubs designated Dopirak for assignment, culminating in his release following the 2007 season.

Toronto Blue Jays
Dopirak signed a minor league contract with the Toronto Blue Jays in March 2008. Dopirak was assigned to Class-A the Dunedin Blue Jays, where he hit .308, while hitting 27 home runs and 88 RBIs. He was promoted to the Blue Jays Double-A team the New Hampshire Fisher Cats where he stayed for the 2008 season. He hit .287 with 2 home runs and 13 RBIs.

He started the 2009 season with the Fisher Cats and hit .308 to go along with 19 homers and 68 RBIs. He then earned another promotion to the Jays Triple-A team the Las Vegas 51s. He hit .330 with 8 home runs and 34 RBIs.

Prior to the 2010 season, Dopirak's contract was purchased by Toronto, adding to the 40-man roster. He became a free agent after the season.

Houston Astros
Dopirak signed a one-year minor league contract with the Houston Astros for the 2011 season, with an invitation to spring training.
He was released on June 16.

Awards
High School All-American 2002 (DH)
Midwest League Most Valuable Player Award 2004
Top Prospect   MLB (#21)
FSL Post-Season All-Star 
FSL Player of the Week 2008
FSL Mid-Season All-Star 2008
R. Howard Webster Award 2008 (Dunedin Blue Jays)
Topps Double-A All-Star 
Eastern League (EAS) Post-Season All-Star 2009
EAS Mid-Season All-Star 2009
EAS Player of the Week 2009
EAS Player of the Week 2009
R. Howard Webster Award 2009 (New Hampshire Fisher Cats)

References

External links

1983 births
Living people
Baseball players from Tampa, Florida
Arizona League Cubs players
Lansing Lugnuts players
Boise Hawks players
Daytona Cubs players
West Tennessee Diamond Jaxx players
Tennessee Smokies players
New Hampshire Fisher Cats players
Navegantes del Magallanes players
American expatriate baseball players in Venezuela
Dunedin Blue Jays players
Las Vegas 51s players
Dunedin High School alumni